Murray is a city in Clarke County, Iowa, United States. The population was 684 at the time of the 2020 census. The mascot is the Murray Mustang.

History
Murray got its start in the year 1868, following the construction of the Chicago, Burlington and Quincy Railroad through the territory.

Geography
Murray is located at  (41.043324, -93.950061).

Demographics

2010 census
As of the census of 2010, there were 756 people, 310 households, and 200 families living in the city. The racial makeup of the city was 98.1% White, 0.5% African American, and 1.3% from other races. Hispanic or Latino of any race were 2.9% of the population.

There were 310 households, of which 31.3% had children under the age of 18 living with them, 48.4% were married couples living together, 9.4% had a female householder with no husband present, 6.8% had a male householder with no wife present, and 35.5% were non-families. 29.0% of all households were made up of individuals, and 13.9% had someone living alone who was 65 years of age or older. The average household size was 2.44 and the average family size was 2.97.

The median age in the city was 36.8 years. 26.5% of residents were under the age of 18; 7.6% were between the ages of 18 and 24; 25.8% were from 25 to 44; 25.2% were from 45 to 64; and 14.8% were 65 years of age or older. The gender makeup of the city was 49.7% male and 50.3% female.

2000 census
As of the census of 2000, there were 766 people, 308 households, and 218 families living in the city. The racial makeup of the city was 98.43% White, 0.65% African American, 0.26% Native American, 0.13% Asian, 0.13% from other races, and 0.39% from two or more races. Hispanic or Latino of any race were 1.31% of the population.

There were 305 households, out of which 37.0% had children under the age of 18 living with them, 53.6% were married couples living together, 12.0% had a female householder with no husband present, and 28.9% were non-families. 26.6% of all households were made up of individuals, and 14.3% had someone living alone who was 65 years of age or older. The average household size was 2.49 and the average family size was 2.97.

In the city, the population was spread out, with 28.2% under the age of 18, 9.0% from 18 to 24, 27.2% from 25 to 44, 20.6% from 45 to 64, and 15.0% who were 65 years of age or older. The median age was 36 years. For every 100 females, there were 93.9 males. For every 100 females age 18 and over, there were 88.4 males.

The median income for a household in the city was $29,879, and the median income for a family was $37,083. Males had a median income of $27,583 versus $20,577 for females. The per capita income for the city was $14,879. About 5.0% of families and 8.2% of the population were below the poverty line, including 7.8% of those under age 18 and 14.0% of those age 65 or over.

Notable person
Meridel Le Sueur, American writer associated with the proletarian movement of the 1930s and 1940s.

References

Cities in Iowa
Cities in Clarke County, Iowa
Populated places established in 1868
1868 establishments in Iowa